Terminalia polycarpa is a small African tree in the family Combretaceae. It is native to Ethiopia, Kenya, and Somalia.

References

polycarpa
Flora of Africa